Darko Lazović (born 15 September 1990) is a Serbian professional footballer who plays as a winger for Serie A club Hellas Verona and the Serbia national team.

At the age of 21, Lazović was recognized as the best young player of the Serbian Superliga in 2011.

Club career

Borac Čačak
From the age of six, Lazović began to train in the youth academy of FK Borac Čačak. By the time he played for the junior team, he was attracting the attention of scouts from outside of Čačak. On 2 March 2008, he made his senior debut for Borac head coach Milovan Rajevac in a league match against Hajduk Kula. He scored his first competitive goal for Borac Čačak on 22 March 2008, in a Serbian Superliga match against Vojvodina. In February 2009, Lazović trained with the first-team of Tottenham Hotspur F.C. for a couple of days, and by 10 February, Borac coach Ljubiša Dmitrović, told the press "For all I know, Lazović has been transferred to Tottenham". However, a contract was never signed, and domestic club Red Star Belgrade took the initiative.

Red Star Belgrade
On 22 June 2009, at the age of 18, Lazović completed a transfer from Borac to Red Star, whose coach at the time was Vladimir Petrović. He signed a four year contract with Red Star. He missed the start of the season due to injury, but made his debut on 12 September 2009 against Metalac Gornji Milanovac. He came off the bench in the 65th minute to replace Nikola Vasiljević. He scored his first goal for Red Star on 23 September 2009, in the sixteenth Serbian Cup match against Mladost Apatin. Red Star went on to win 6–1 and Lazović scored a brace. Otherwise, Lazović saw little playing time until the arrival of coach Robert Prosinečki, after which he was named as best young player in the Serbian Superliga. He played an important role in Red Star's 2011–12 UEFA Europa League qualifying campaign, as he started most of the games and contributed to a deep run into the qualification playoff, where Red Star lost to Stade Rennais.

In the semi-final of the 2011–12 Serbian Cup, On 11 April 2012, he scored a goal against historic rival Partizan, in a game which Red Star won 2–0. That year, Red Star would go on to win the 2012 Serbian Cup Final. On 4 July 2012, Lazović signed a three-year contract extension, ending speculation about a possible transfer after Red Bull Salzburg made an offer for him. Although Red Star didn't win the league that season, it was the second consecutive season in which Red Star made a play-off run in the UEFA Europa League qualifying phase. During the 2011-12 Europa League campaign, Lazović contributed with assists against Naftan Novopolotsk and played full matches against Omonia and Bordeaux.

Although a period of instability followed at Red Star, Lazović remained in the starting eleven even after a quick succession of coaches: Robert Prosinečki, Aleksandar Janković, and Ricardo Sá Pinto. However, on 18 May 2013, in a match against Partizan, he suffered a season-ending knee injury, eight minutes into the game.

While Lazović was injured, Ricardo Sá Pinto voluntarily resigned from Red Star, and new coach Slaviša Stojanovič was enthusiastic about giving Lazović some playing time as soon as his injury allowed. On 22 February 2014, Lazović played his first competitive match after eight months of injury and made an assist against Javor. On 12 April 2014, Lazović scored a hat-trick against Čukarički. first in career. Lazović won his first championship with Red Star at the end of the season, after a win against OFK Beograd in a front of 55,000 fans.

After the departure of Nenad Milijaš and suspension of Nikola Mijailović during season, Lazović was appointed as new captain of Red Star Belgrade. On 14 January 2015, it was announced that at the end of the season, after six years in Red Star Belgrade, as a free player, Lazović would sign A multiyear contract with Serie A club Genoa. In his last season with Red Star, he scored 10 goals and was the team's top scorer. His last game with Red Star was on 24 May 2015, in a win against Mladost Lučani.

Genoa
In summer 2015, Lazović signed with Serie A team Genoa. In a friendly match against Hertha BSC on 1 August 2015, Lazović scored his first goal for Genoa in their 0–2 away win. On 8 November 2015, Lazović produced two assists in a 2–2 tie with Frosinone Calcio, and was subsequently named in the Serie A "Team of the Week". On 16 December 2016, Lazović scored his first goal for Genoa against Fiorentina, in a match that was only 62 minutes long as it was meant as a continuation of an unfinished match from 11 September which had been abandoned due to an unusual hailstorm. His contract expired and he left the club on 30 June 2019.

Hellas Verona
On 6 August 2019, Lazović signed a three-year contract with Serie A club Hellas Verona.

International career
After being called up by coach Radomir Antić, Lazović made his first appearance for Serbia on 14 December 2008, in a friendly match against Poland. He did not play for the national team until four years later when he came in as a substitute in the 76th minute against France during a friendly match on 31 May 2012. On 5 June 2012, during his third game for the senior team, he scored an impressive goal against Sweden which was disallowed by the referee.

In November 2022, he was selected in Serbia's squad for the 2022 FIFA World Cup in Qatar. He played in a group stage match against Brazil. Serbia finished fourth in the group.

Career statistics

Club

International

Honours
Red Star
Serbian SuperLiga: 2013–14
Serbian Cup: 2009–10, 2011–12

Individual
 Serbian SuperLiga Team of the Season: 2011–12, 2013–14

References

External links
 
 Darko Lazović at Utakmica.rs 

1990 births
Living people
Sportspeople from Čačak
Serbian footballers
Association football midfielders
Serbia international footballers
Serbia under-21 international footballers
Serbian expatriate footballers
FK Borac Čačak players
Red Star Belgrade footballers
Genoa C.F.C. players
Hellas Verona F.C. players
Serbian SuperLiga players
Serie A players
Expatriate footballers in Italy
Serbian expatriate sportspeople in Italy
2022 FIFA World Cup players